Lovato is a surname of northern Italian origin. It derives from the Late Latin personal name Lupatus, derivative of Latin lupus, meaning "wolf".

People with the name include:
Demi Lovato (born 1992), American singer and actor
Frank Lovato Jr. (born 1963), American jockey
Lovato Lovati (1241–1309), Italian scholar, judge, and humanist
Roberto Lovato (born 1963), American journalist and commentator
Tony Lovato (born 1980), American singer and guitarist with the band Mest
Rafael Lovato Jr. (born 1983), American jiu-jitsu practitioner and mixed martial artist
Matteo Lovato (born 2000), Italian footballer

Surnames of Italian origin
Italian-language surnames